Cermegeşti may refer to several villages in Romania:

 Cermegeşti, a village in Lădești Commune, Vâlcea County
 Cermegeşti, a village in Pesceana Commune, Vâlcea County